Matich is a surname. Notable people with the surname include:

Frank Matich (1935–2015), Australian racing car driver
Matt Matich (born 1991), New Zealand rugby union player 
Trevor Matich (born 1961),  American football analyst and former player

See also
Matić